Greatest hits is a 1977 Arista Records compilation album by the Bay City Rollers. It includes songs from five of their first seven studio albums.

Critical reception

Chris Woodstra of AllMusic writes, "the Rollers' music has an enduring innocence and charm with enough catchy hooks and pure pop melodies to compete with other power-pop bands of the era."

Robert Christgau gives the album a C+ and begins his unfavorable review with, "Rollermania in this country was pretty depressing." His review did not improve any after that beginning.

Track listing

Track information and credits adapted from the album's liner notes.

Musicians
Bay City Rollers
Eric Faulkner – Guitar, violin, mandolin, bass
Alan Longmuir – Bass guitar, accordion, piano
Derek Longmuir – Drums, congas, tambourine
Les McKeown – Lead vocals, guitar
Stuart "Woody" Wood – Guitar, bass, piano, mandolin

Production

Jimmy Ienner – Producer (tracks 1, 5-6)
Phil Wainman – Producer (tracks 2, 7, 9)
Colin Frechter – Producer (track 3)
Harry Maslin – Producer (tracks 4, 8)
Bill Martin & Phil Coulter – Producer (track 10)
Mastered By – Bill Inglot, Ken Perry
Gary Hertz – Liner Notes
Bill Inglot – Digital Compilation, Digital Mastering
Ken Perry – Digital Compilation, Digital Mastering
Cover photos courtesy of 16 Magazine

Charts

References

1977 compilation albums
Bay City Rollers albums
Arista Records compilation albums